Acoustic Masters I is an album by jazz saxophonist Charles Lloyd recorded in July 1993 by Lloyd with Cedar Walton, Buster Williams and Billy Higgins.

Reception
The Allmusic review awarded the album 4½ stars.

Track listing
All compositions by Charles Lloyd except as indicated
 "Blues for Bill" – 9:48  
 "Clandestine" (Cedar Walton) – 9:08  
 "Sweet Georgia Bright" – 5:52  
 "Lady Day" – 7:13  
 "Green Chimneys" (Thelonious Monk) – 5:50  
 "Strivers Jewels" (Buster Williams) – 5:23  
 "Hommage" – 10:04  
 "To C.L." (Billy Higgins) – 6:03

Personnel
Charles Lloyd – tenor saxophone
Cedar Walton – piano
Buster Williams – double bass
Billy Higgins – drums

References

1994 albums
Atlantic Records albums
Charles Lloyd (jazz musician) albums
Albums produced by Lenny White